The Baladites, formally known as the Lebanese Maronite Order (abbreviated OLM), is a monastic order among the Levant-based, Catholic Maronite Church, which from the beginning has been specifically a monastic Church. The order was founded in 1694 in the Monastery of Mart Moura, Ehden, Lebanon, by three Maronite young men from Aleppo, Syria, under the patronage of Patriarch Estephan El Douaihy (1670–1704).

The Aleppian monks of Aleppo, a city in present Syria resulted from a split with the Baladites. Pope Clement XIV sanctioned this separation in 1770.

See also
 Monastery of Qozhaya
 Maronite Religious Institutes (Orders)
 Antonins
 Aleppians
 Kreimists or Lebanese missionaries
 Melkite Religious Institutes (Orders)
 Basilian Chouerite Order
 Basilian Salvatorian Order
 Basilian Alepian Order

References

External links
 
 History of the Baladites at the official website of the Monastery of Qozhaya

Maronite orders and societies
Religious organizations established in 1695
1695 establishments in Asia